Jože Urankar (28 October 1939 – November 2021) was a Slovenian weightlifter. He competed in the men's light heavyweight event at the 1972 Summer Olympics. Urankar died in November 2021, at the age of 82.

References

External links
 

1939 births
2021 deaths
Slovenian male weightlifters
Olympic weightlifters of Yugoslavia
Weightlifters at the 1972 Summer Olympics
Sportspeople from Celje